Merz Peninsula is an irregular, ice-covered peninsula, about  long in an east–west direction and averaging  wide, between Hilton Inlet and Violante Inlet on the east coast of Palmer Land, Antarctica. It was discovered and photographed from the air in December 1940 by the US Antarctic Service; during 1947 it was photographed from the air by the Ronne Antarctic Research Expedition under Finn Ronne, who in conjunction with the Falkland Islands Dependencies Survey (FIDS) charted it from the ground. The peninsula was named by the FIDS for Alfred Merz, a noted Austrian oceanographer and the original leader of the German expedition in the Meteor, 1925–26.

References

Peninsulas of Palmer Land